Austrheim Church is a parish church of the Church of Norway in Austrheim Municipality in Vestland county, Norway. It is located in the village of Austrheim on the island of Fosnøyna. It is the church for the Austrheim parish which is part of the Nordhordland prosti (deanery) in the Diocese of Bjørgvin. The white, wooden church was built in a long church design in 1865 using plans drawn up by the architect Askild Åse. The church seats about 355 people.

History
The earliest existing historical records of the church date back to the year 1329, but it was not built that year. The first church was a wooden stave church that was likely built during the 13th century. That old church was replaced by a log church during the early 1600s. On 16 November 1710, the church tower was badly damaged by lightning and major repairs were carried out afterwards to repair the tower and its supporting structures. It was consecrated on 2 April 1865 by the Bishop Peter Hersleb Graah Birkeland. After the new church completed, the old church was demolished.

Media gallery

See also
List of churches in Bjørgvin

References

Austrheim
Churches in Vestland
Long churches in Norway
Wooden churches in Norway
19th-century Church of Norway church buildings
Churches completed in 1865
13th-century establishments in Norway